Vaitiare Kenti Robles Salas (born 15 February 1991), known as Kenti Robles, is a Mexican professional footballer who plays as a right back for Spanish Primera División club Real Madrid CF and the Mexico women's national team. She holds dual Spanish and Mexican citizenship.

Career
Robles has been playing in Spain since she was 14 years old, being brought up in Espanyol's youth team. In 2009, she was promoted to the first team, and that same season she won her first title, the national Cup. After playing the 2011 World Cup with Mexico, she moved to local rivals Barcelona where she played in the UEFA Women's Champions League and helped the team win three league titles from 2011 to 2014. In August 2014, she re-joined Espanyol. In 2015, she joined Atlético de Madrid, where she played for 5 years, earning her 3 La Liga titles and a Copa de la Reina. In the summer of 2020, she joined city rivals Real Madrid, who played the previous year as CD Tacón.

Personal life
Before settling in Spain, Robles lived in the Dominican Republic. Her mother is originally from Peru.

Honours
Espanyol
 Copa de la Reina : 2010

Barcelona
 Primera División : 2011–12, 2012–13, 2013–14
 Copa de la Reina : 2013, 2014

Atlético de Madrid
 Primera División : 2016–17, 2017–18
 Copa de la Reina : 2016

References

External links
 
 
 Profile  at Mexican Football Federation
 Profile  at RCD Espanyol
 

1991 births
Living people
Women's association football fullbacks
Mexican women's footballers
Footballers from Mexico City
Mexican people of Peruvian descent
Mexico women's international footballers
2011 FIFA Women's World Cup players
2015 FIFA Women's World Cup players
Pan American Games bronze medalists for Mexico
Pan American Games medalists in football
Footballers at the 2011 Pan American Games
Footballers at the 2019 Pan American Games
Mexican emigrants to the Dominican Republic
Mexican expatriate women's footballers
Mexican emigrants to Spain
Naturalised citizens of Spain
Spanish women's footballers

Footballers from Catalonia

Spanish people of Mexican descent
Sportspeople of Mexican descent
Spanish people of Peruvian descent
Primera División (women) players
RCD Espanyol Femenino players
FC Barcelona Femení players
Atlético Madrid Femenino players
Real Madrid Femenino players
Medalists at the 2011 Pan American Games
Mexican footballers